Alfred Winkler (born 4 May 1943) is a German skier. He competed in the Nordic combined at the 1968 Winter Olympics and the 1972 Winter Olympics.

References

External links
 

1943 births
Living people
German male Nordic combined skiers
Olympic Nordic combined skiers of West Germany
Nordic combined skiers at the 1968 Winter Olympics
Nordic combined skiers at the 1972 Winter Olympics
People from Oława County